Kenneth E. Scott (1928–2016) was an American lawyer, having been the Ralph M. Parsons Professor Emeritus of Law and Business at Stanford Law School.

References

1928 births
2016 deaths
Stanford Law School faculty
Princeton University alumni
Stanford Law School alumni
20th-century American lawyers